Carol McGuire is an American politician who has represented the Merrimack 29th district of the New Hampshire House of Representatives since 2008.

References 

Living people
21st-century American women politicians
21st-century American politicians
Republican Party members of the New Hampshire House of Representatives
Women state legislators in New Hampshire
Year of birth missing (living people)